St. Jerome in His Study is an oil on panel  painting by German Renaissance artist Albrecht Dürer, completed March 1521. It is now in the Museu Nacional de Arte Antiga of Lisbon, Portugal.

History
The work was executed by Dürer during his stay in the Netherlands 1520–1521,  using an aged local man as model. A preparatory drawing exists in the Albertina of Vienna with an annotation of the man's age (93).

The artist donated the painting to the head of the Portuguese trade mission in the Netherlands, Rodrigo Fernandes de Almada. It remained in the latter's family collection until 1880, when it was donated to the current museum.

Description
Among Dürer's depiction of St. Jerome,  this is the one more resembling a portrait, with little space left for the study and its details (such as in his 1514 etching, where the saint is a small figure in the background).

The subject is portrayed with great care for details, including the wrinkles to the white-yellowish beard. Also differently from the etching, the memento mori suggestion of the finger above a skull has a greater visual relevance.

Details in the foreground include the inkpot at right and the bookrest at left, as well as a crucifix on the top left.

References

Sources

External links
Page at the museum official website 

Paintings by Albrecht Dürer
1521 paintings
Durer
Paintings in the collection of the National Museum of Ancient Art
Books in art
Skulls in art